Pardalinops is a genus of sea snails, marine gastropod mollusks in the family Columbellidae; the dove snails.

Species
Species within the genus Pardalinops include:
 Pardalinops aspersa (G.B. Sowerby I, 1844)
 Pardalinops borroni Thach, 2018
 Pardalinops jousseaumei (Drivas & Jay, 1997)
 Pardalinops marmorata (Gray, 1839)
 Pardalinops propinqua (Smith, 1891)
 Pardalinops testudinaria (Link, 1807)

References

 deMaintenon, M. (2008). Results of the Rumphius Biohistorical Expedition to Ambon (1990). Part 14. The Columbellidae (Gastropoda: Neogastropoda) collected at Ambon during the Rumphius Biohistorical Expedition. Zoologische Mededelingen. 82(34):341-374.

External links
 Jousseaume, F. (1888). Description des mollusques recueillis par M. le Dr. Faurot dans la Mer Rouge et le Golfe d'Aden. Mémoires de la Société Zoologique de France. 1: 165-223

Columbellidae